

q

Q-Gesic
Q-Pam (Quantum Pharmics)
Q-Vel

qu

Quaalude (Rorer)
quadazocine (INN)
Quadramet
quadrosilan (INN)
Qualisone
quarfloxin (USAN)
Quarzan (Roche)
quatacaine (INN)
quazepam (INN)
quazinone (INN)
quazodine (INN)
quazolast (INN)
Quelicin
Queltuss
Questran (Bristol-Myers Squibb)
quetiapine (INN)
Quibron-T
Quide
quifenadine (INN)
quiflapon (INN)
quillifoline (INN)
quilostigmine (INN)
quinacainol (INN)
quinacillin (INN)
Quinact
Quinaglute
quinagolide (INN)
Quinalan
quinaldine blue (INN)
Quinamm (Marion Merrell Dow)
quinapril (INN)
quinaprilat (INN)
Quinaretic
Quinatime
quinazosin (INN)
quinbolone (INN)
quincarbate (INN)
quindecamine (INN)
quindonium bromide (INN)
quindoxin (INN)
quinelorane (INN)
quinestradol (INN)
quinestrol (INN)
quinetalate (INN)
quinethazone (INN)
quinezamide (INN)
quinfamide (INN)
quingestanol (INN)
quingestrone (INN)
Quinidex
quinine (USAN)
quinisocaine (INN)
quinocide (INN)
Quinora
quinotolast (INN)
quinpirole (INN)
quinprenaline (INN)
Quintasa (Ferring Pharmaceuticals)
quintiofos (INN)
quinuclium bromide (INN)
quinupramine (INN)
quinupristin (INN)
Quiphile
quipazine (INN)
quisultazine (INN)
quitiapine (INN)
Quixin (Vistakon Pharmaceuticals)
quizartinib (USAN, INN)
Qvar